is a former Japanese football player.

Club statistics

References

External links

1980 births
Living people
University of Teacher Education Fukuoka alumni
Association football people from Miyazaki Prefecture
Japanese footballers
J2 League players
Japan Football League players
Giravanz Kitakyushu players
Association football midfielders